KBER (101.1 FM) is a radio station broadcasting a mainstream rock format. Licensed to Ogden, Utah, United States, the station serves the Salt Lake City metropolitan area. The station is currently owned by Cumulus Media. The station's studios are located in South Salt Lake (behind the I-15/I-80 interchange).

History
Prior to March 1986, KBER was known as KDAB, and was licensed to Ogden (as KBER is to this day). It was known then as "B101". KBER began on 106.5, but moved to its current dial position in March 1990. It was purchased by Citadel Broadcasting during that time. It also morphed into "101 The Bear". The station employed a number of on-air talent including "Uncle Nasty". Uncle Nasty's irreverent style translated into an instant following especially with Men 18–34. Uncle Nasty was on air 7pm to 12am, then moved to morning drive a year later. In 1998 the station reverted to the more familiar "KBER 101" slogan of its earlier years and is currently a top rated mainstream rock station in Salt Lake City Utah. By 2008, the station's sister station KHTB became a modern rock station, carrying mostly newer rock. KBER gradually began to change its playlist to include more classic rock songs, although it has since returned to a mainstream rock format. Later on, Mediabase & Nielsen BDS began reporting KBER on the mainstream rock panel. Citadel merged with Cumulus Media on September 16, 2011.

Early programming
The station arrived as one of the leading FM radio stations in the market with on air personalities Street and Katherine, Tom Collins, Kevin Lewis, John Edwards, Mark Christiansen and Jay "J-bear" Stevens to name a few. The early to mid 1990s were the wild days with Cory "Porn Master" Draper, Casey "The Night Rocker" Baird, Kevin "Easy" Eason, Alan "Dr. Rock" Bain, Mark "Erection" Erickson, "Young Hung" Brandon Young, Ron Harrison, Allen "My Wife has me by the Balls" Handy, Helmut "No longer a part timer" Von Schmidt, Chris Howey "Opie Asswipe", Jamie "Hymie Escalante" Valle'e, the screaming weather man, Patrick "Skye Bleu" Burton, Michael Hayes, Nate "The Hitman", Bryan Suits, Charlee Simons and others. Those were the days of Mike Marble's wildly successful KBER-RAFTERS Showcase Concert Series.

The Ron & Allen Morning Show was wildly popular and they even had their own television show called "Rock Utah" which aired on local channel 30. Some of the more memorable events the morning show perpetrated were the "Heterosexual Pride Parade", a wrestling match between Ron and the "Punisher" against Allen and Hymie, which raised money for the MDA, Hymie taking the morn show and some listeners skydiving, Allen and Hymie driving a top fuel dragster at Bonneville Raceway, and a hoax which had listeners believing that Allen Handy had been arrested by the Secret Service.  The show was every bit as wild as anything being done at the time in the largest markets, including Howard Stern in New York City.  After Ron Harrison was summarily dismissed for an on-air stunt, Allen Handy and Michael Hayes took over as "Handy & Hayes" for several months carrying on the tradition of placing within the top 1-2 stations in the 18-34 demographic within Salt Lake City's market.

Darby hosted the midday show prior to Kelly Hammer taking over in 2008. Prior to Darby, the midday shift was hosted by Helen Powers, who went on to work for a number of other radio stations.

Mornings during the week on KBER previously featured the syndicated "Bob and Tom Show". The Mick and Allen Show returned to KBER in 2005. and remained until 2023.

Current programming 
Along with regular shows including Helmut VonSchmidt who has been with the station for nearly 30 years, the station also does live broadcasts during business or station promotions at various events. Every year, KBER hosts an event known as "The North Pole Express" which is a take on the story The Polar Express and is an event co-hosted by the Make-A-Wish Foundation. It is held at Soldier Hollow, outside of Heber, Utah.

Signal
KBER broadcasts an HD signal along with analog on 101.1 MHz. As with its sister FM stations, the station has an ERP of 25,000 watts. This, along with the characteristics and elevation of Farnsworth Peak allow KBER to be received in most of northern Utah, specifically the Wasatch Front.

References

External links
KBER official website

Mainstream rock radio stations in the United States
BER
Mass media in Salt Lake City
Radio stations established in 1986
Cumulus Media radio stations
1986 establishments in Utah